String cheese is any of several different types of cheese where the manufacturing process aligns the proteins in the cheese, which makes it stringy.

When mozzarella is heated to 60 °C (140 °F) and then stretched, the milk proteins line up. It is possible to peel strings or strips from the larger cheese.

Central Europe 
In Slovakia, korbáčiky are made, which is a salty sheep milk cheese, available smoked or unsmoked. It is traditionally made by hand-pulling steamed sheep's cheese into strings and braiding them. Cow milk versions are also available. The town of Zázrivá is known as the center of the production of this cheese. Similar cheeses are found also in the adjacent regions of South Poland.

Eastern Europe/West Asia
In Turkey, the most common type of string cheese is dil peyniri ("tongue cheese"), a fresh white cheese made from cow's milk, traditionally in the provinces of Bilecik and Bursa. The stringy texture of dil becomes even more prominent when the cheese is melted.

In Armenia, traditional string cheese, chechil, is made with a white base. The type of milk used usually comes from an aged goat or sheep depending upon the production methods of the area of choice. It is seasoned with black cumin and mahleb, and is traditionally sold in the form of a braided endless loop. The cheese forms into strings due to how it is pulled during processing. It is also made in Syria and Turkey, both countries with significant Armenian populations.

In Georgia and Russia string cheese is known as tenili. It is made from fermented sheep's milk and cream allowed to mature for 60 days in a salted and dried veal stomach.

Western Europe
Cheestrings became a popular snack in the UK and Republic of Ireland soon after their introduction in 1996. They are made from real cheese, not processed cheese, by Kerry Group and the mascot is a cartoon character called Mr Strings.

Cheestrings are currently available in Original (a cheese akin to mozzarella) and the two-colour Twisted variety. Discontinued flavours include cheddar, smoky bacon, and pizza, with the pizza flavour being reintroduced in May 2021 to celebrate the 25th anniversary of Cheestrings. 

Kerry exports Gouda Cheestrings from Charleville, County Cork to the Netherlands, and a Gouda-Emmental mix to France, where the product is known as Ficello. Low cost imitations of the original cheddar Cheestrings were formerly manufactured in the UK by Tesco, Dairylea, and currently by Dunnes Stores. An item in the product range of the original Kerry Cheestrings, known as Attack-A-Snack (a rival to Dairylea Lunchables), packaged with a tortilla wrap or cracker, sachet of tomato ketchup, and piece of processed ham has been available from the late 90s.

North America

Mexico 
In Mexico, the first type of string cheese was invented in 1885 by Leobarda Castellanos García at 14 years old. A very popular type of string cheese called Quesillo is sold today in balls of various sizes. It is also known as "Queso Oaxaca" or Oaxaca cheese referred to the place of origin it was invented, and now it's widely popular in all Mexican territories.

United States 

In the United States, string cheese generally refers to snack-sized servings of low-moisture mozzarella. The common term is a "cheese stick" which is cut and packaged, either individually or as a package of several lengths.

The cheese used is commonly a form of mozzarella, or a combination of mozzarella and cheddar. This type of string cheese gets its name because it can be eaten by pulling strips of cheese from the cylinder along its length and eating these strings. It was invented in 1976 by Frank Baker.

Central America and Caribbean 
In the Dominican Republic is produced the "Queso de Hoja", a type of stringy, salty mozzarella in form of a ball, mostly served with toast or crackers.

Oceania
In Australia, string cheese is sold by Bega Cheese and is called Bega Stringers. String cheese can also be sold in a can. In the Marquesas Islands, a popular variety of string cheese is made from breadfruit proteins and buffalo milk, and is marketed under the brand Sea King String.

See also

 Armenian cuisine
 List of cheeses
 List of stretch-cured cheeses
 Pasta filata

References

External links
 Process of making mozzarella cheese  — US Patent 5567464
 

American cheeses
Snack foods
Stretched-curd cheeses